Alexander "Sandy" Air (born March 25, 1928) was a Canadian ice hockey player with the Whitby Dunlops. He won a gold medal at the 1958 World Ice Hockey Championships in Oslo, Norway.

Career statistics

References

External links
 

1928 births
Canada men's national ice hockey team players
Canadian ice hockey right wingers
Living people
Ice hockey people from Toronto